Valerie Ann Taylor,  (born 8 February 1944) is a British-Bangladeshi physiotherapist, social worker and philanthropist.  She is the founder of Centre for the Rehabilitation of the Paralysed (CRP) in Savar, Dhaka District. Dubbed Mother Theresa of Bangladesh, she was awarded 2004 Independence Day Award by the Government of Bangladesh for her public service. In 1998, she was granted Bangladeshi citizenship by the Prime Minister of Bangladesh.

Early life
Taylor was born in Kent, England to Marie Taylor and William Taylor. She grew up living close to National Spinal Injuries Centre at Stoke Mandeville Hospital in England.

Career
In 1969, Taylor came to Bangladesh, under contract for 15 months, with the Voluntary Service Overseas (VSO) to work as a physiotherapist in the Christian Hospital, Chandraghona in the Chittagong Hill Tracts. She established the Centre for the Rehabilitation of the Paralysed (CRP) in 1979. At the start of her career, she was running CRP with four patients in an abandoned warehouse of the Shaheed Suhrawardy Hospital. Later CRP has grown to include a 100-bed hospital.

Personal life
Taylor is a legal guardian to two girls with disabilities, Joyti and Poppy.

Awards and honors
 Officer of the Order of the British Empire (OBE) (1995) 
 Arthur Eyre Brook Gold Medal (1996)
 National Social Service Award (2000)
 Anannya Top Ten Awards (2000)
 Millennium Award (2000)
 Dr. MR Khan and Anwara Trust Gold Medal (2001)
 Hakkani Mission Bangladesh Award (2001)
 Bangladesh Independence Day Award (2004)
 Rokeya Shining Personality Award (2005)
 Princess Diana Gold Medal (2007)
 Mahatma Gandhi Peace Award (2009)
 Lifetime Achievement Award by Hope Foundation for Women & Children of Bangladesh (2009)
 Nova Southeastern University Award (2009)
 Rotary International Award (2013)
 National Environment Award (2020)

References

Further reading
 
 

 

Living people
1944 births
People from Bromley
English women philanthropists
British physiotherapists
English social workers
Bangladeshi philanthropists
Bangladeshi physiotherapists
Bangladeshi social workers
British emigrants to Bangladesh
Bangladeshi people of English descent
Naturalised citizens of Bangladesh
Officers of the Order of the British Empire
Recipients of the Independence Day Award